Based primarily on the earliest known written references of Abhinavagupta and Al-Biruni, academics estimate the date of origin of the Bhagavata Purana to be between 800–1000 C.E.

Indian cultural tradition 
 It is impossible to accurately date Vedic literature as Indian culture emphasised oral tradition over written. Therefore Vedic literature was spoken long before being written:

Indian culture also emphasised intertextuality (e.g. recycling, elaborating, and reprocessing existing stories, teachings, etc.) over novelty, meaning Vedic literature shared common elements between one another (e.g. philosophies, themes, genealogies, myths, etc.):

Many elements, such as the Vamana avatar of Vishnu (Sanskrit वामन, meaning 'dwarf' or 'small or short in stature'; eighth canto of the Bhagavata), can be traced back directly to the Rig Veda, the most ancient scripture:

From the Rig Veda itself:

Summary of Findings 
Based on the references below:

 The Atharvaveda (e.g. hymn 11:7) - one of the four Vedas - is the earliest known written record that mentions Puranas in general
 Abhinavagupta (950-1016 C.E) authored the earliest known written record that specifically referenced the Bhagavata Purana
 Al-Biruni (973-1050 C.E.) authored a list of Puranas that named the Bhagavata, and explicitly stated that list originated from the Vishnu Purana
Vopadeva (circa 1350 C.E.) - a grammarian and commentator on the Bhagavata - is not the author of this scripture (as surmised by some Indologists)

The earliest known written references to the Srimad Bhagavatam - of which there are two - can be reliably dated to between 950-1050 C.E.; otherwise, there is no known evidence to establish a date of origin for this or any other Vedic literature. The overall academic consensus of between 800-1000 C.E. for a date of origin is entirely speculative and based on assumptions such as:

 Allowing a couple of centuries prior to the lives of historical figures for the Bhagavata to have become influential in their time
 Composition based on and therefore after the Vishnu Purana (which itself cannot be reliably dated)
 Composition in entirety after historical events or dynasties mentioned (i.e. rather than amendments to existing work, or actual prophesies)  
 An absence of known, written references by figures such as Ramanuja (1017–1137 C.E.) and Yamuna (circa 900 C.E.)

Daniel P. Sheridan 
Theologian Daniel P. Sheridan:

Citing J.A.B. van Buitenen, Thomas Hopkins, Moriz Winternitz,  Chintaman Vinayak Vaidya, and Friedhelm Hardy to support his claim, Sheridan admits this range has only been 'derived circumstantially' (i.e. speculated or inferred). To know exactly what  'derived circumstantially' means and how it affects accuracy or reliability, these citations will be examined, starting with J.A.B. van Builtenen.

J.A.B. van Buitenen 
Indologist J.A.B. van Buitenen:

That Ramanuja (1017–1137 C.E.) did not reference the Bhagavata Purana is immaterial as he was born after Abhinavagupta (950-1016 C.E) - who did reference the Bhagavata - died.  Al-Biruni (973-1050) also referenced the Bhagavata Purana.

Abhinavagupta 
The reference to Abhinavagupta (950-1016 C.E):

The assertion that Vyasa is the incarnation of God (1.3.40) and the story of Yashoda seeing the universal form in the mouth of boy Krishna (10.8.37-39) are specific to the Srimad Bhagavatam (e.g. not in the Vishnu Purana or Bhagavad Gita). As Abhinavagupta died in 1016 C.E., his devotional poem referencing the Bhagavata Purana would have been composed by that year at the very latest. Significantly, this proves Vopadeva (ca. 1350) could not be the author of the Bhagavata as it was referenced around three hundred years before he was born.

Al-Biruni 
The reference to Al-Biruni (emphasis added):

This evidences three significant facts. First, Vopadeva (ca. 1350) - again - could not be the author of the Bhagavatam as it was listed by Al-Biruni (973-1050) around three hundred years before Vopadeva was born. Second, Al-Biruni stated the Bhagavatam was listed in the Vishnu Purana. And third, although Al-Biruni cited the Vishnu Purana and Bhagavad Gita extensively, he did not cite or quote the Bhagavatam (i.e. only listed it by name).

Yamuna 
No known writings of Yamuna (circa 900 C.E.) reference the Srimad Bhagavatam. Yamuna does however acknowledge and refute orthodox Smarta objections that opposed the 'less-than-respectable Bhagavatas' (meaning 'devotees of Vishnu'), although this may concern the influence of the Vishnu Purana rather than the Srimad Bhagavatam:

T.J. Hopkins 
The reference to Thomas Johns Hopkins is from 'The Vaishnava Bhakti Movement in the "Bhagavata Purana"'. However, this text cannot be read or verified as it seems to be an unpublished thesis or dissertation.

Moriz Winternitz 
The reference to Moriz Winternitz:

Exactly what Winternitz meant by the Bhagavata being 'undoubtedly dependent' on the Vishnu Purana is not explained; neither are the nature or extent its being 'closely connected' or its 'literal agreement'. As such, the claim made is purely speculative and without evidence. The footnote has been examined below, beginning with Bhandarkar, as C.V. Vaidya was also cited by Sheridan and is addressed in another section.

R. G. Bhandarkar 
The reference to R. G. Bhandarkar:

Anandatirtha lived between 1238-1317 C.E. The claims made by Bhandarkar are entirely speculative and without any arguments or evidence to support them. This includes no refutation of the possibility an earlier copy of the manuscript may have been re-written in 'modern' language or what 'modern' means (especially in relation to contradicting other academics' assertions that the Bhagavata uses of 'archaic' language). Clearly Bhandarkar's posited date of origin for the Bhagavata Purana - around 1038-1117 C.E. - is nonsense given this is 20-100 years after Abhinavagupta had already referenced it. As for the purported 'mistake' found, said to be on page 46 of the above book, no reference to any mistake was found, nor any reference to the Bhagavata Purana.

F. E. Pargiter 
The reference to F. E. Pargiter:

Although repeating this claim on pages 72 and 80 (as quoted above) no argument or evidence to support it is provided, and therefore it is purely speculative. Tellingly, Pargiter admitted on page 131 'I have not studied Vedic literature closely''', despite having written a book about it.

 J.N. Farquhar 
The reference to J.N. Farquhar:  

Farquhar only speculates based on the account of Al-Biruni (as above). No new information or evidence is presented. Farqhar's claim in respect to the Bhagavata Purana 'standing nearer' to Sankara's system than Sankhya philosophy (notwithstanding no explanation for what this means exactly, or to what extent), seems to contradict the fact that its third canto features the appearance and teachings of the Kapila incarnation (or avatar) of Vishnu/Krishna, the founder of Sankhya philosophy.

 Charles Eliot 
The reference to Charles Eliot:

No speculation on the date of origin is provided by Eliot, only speculation that the Srimad Bhagavatam is not a later Purana based on 'contemplation of Smarta rites', although exactly what he meant by this is not explained. Notably, Eliot contradicts other academics' claims that the Bhagavata Purana is a later Purana, although both views are still entirely speculative. That Ramanuja did not cite the Bhagavata is addressed above in respect to J.A.B. van Buitenen. A reference to C.V. Vaidya is also made, albeit in respect to geographical origin on this occasion, not dates; he is addressed nonetheless in the next section.

 Chintaman Vinayak Vaidya 
Although writer C.V. Vaidya was cited by Sheridan in respect to the Bhagavata's speculated number of authors ('it appears to be the work on one author'), and by Eliot in respect to geographical origin ('South India', an area where writing would least likely be known compared to the NorthWest), he was also cited by Winternitz in respect to its speculated date of origin:

It is true that the Vishnu Purana does mention the Kilakila Yavanas in Chapter XXIV (Book 4), albeit as a prophecy, not an historical account. However, K. R. Subramanian posits the Kilakila invasion of Andhara to be as early as 225 A.D./C.E., over 200 years earlier than Vaidya. Regardless, even if Vaidya does not accept the prophetic nature of this material in the Vishnu Purana, he does not account for the possibility this information could simply have been added to an existing Purana (i.e. rather than being composed from scratch during or after this point). Consequently, Vaidya's claim about the date of origin of the Vishnu Purana is speculative in nature and without evidence.

Exactly what Vaidya meant by the Bhagavata following the Vishnu Purana 'at a distance' is not explained, rendering the claim virtually meaningless. While likely to mean (as more explicitly claimed by others) that the Srimad Bhagavatam copied from the Vishnu Purana (again intertextuality is a notable feature of Indian culture), even if true, no information on the origin of the Vishnu Purana or 'distance' (in years) from the Bhagavata Purana is given, nor is any evidence provided to support the supposition that the scripture originated after 800 C.E.

 Friedhelm Hardy 
The reference to Friedhelm Hardy is from 'Viraha-bhakti: The Early History of Kṛṣṇa Devotion in South India'. Sheridan stated in footnote 25 (page 7) that Hardy claimed 'some passages of the Bhagavata are translation-passages of Alvar Poems'''. This text has not been read or verified yet. However, another text by Hardy was found - published within the Journal of the Royal Asiatic Society - that also claimed Alvar Poems are linked to the Bhagavata Purana (and to Bengali Saint Chaitanya, founder of Gaudiya Vaishnavism) and provided a tentative date of origin for the scripture at 1000 C.E.: 

The problem with this particular quote is that it is so abstract - with no clear examples or definitions of what is meant by terms such as 'similar bhakti', 'considerable minor differences', or 'character of the bhakti' - it is essentially meaningless. It is also less than ideal that Hardy avoids producing any specifics by stating doing so would require a separate study. Ergo, Hardy's claims are pure speculation and no actual evidence is provided to support the date of origin postulated (1000 C.E., which would mean the Bhagavata Purana would have only existed for a maximum of 16 years before Abhinavagupta quoted it, and a maximum of 50 years before Al-Burini listed it from the Vishnu Purana).

Edwin F. Bryant 
Indologist Edwin F. Bryant: 

Although claiming 'most scholars' believe the 18 Puranas (including the Bhagavata Purana) were compiled between 500-700 C.E., Bryant's footnote to support this (page 133 of the same book) does not say who or how many or even mention a single scholar at all:

Freda Matchett 
Author Freda Matchett:

It is true that the Atharvaveda mentions the word Purana (more examples are given in the Puranas article):

Matchett makes the same citation to Hardy as Sheridan (addressed above) and another to Rocher (addressed below).

Ludo Rocher 
The reference to Ludo Rocher:

In part 2 of the same work - after discussing the belief amongst some (including H.H. Wilson) that Vopadeva was the author of the Bhagavata Purana (discredited, see Al-Burini, above) - Rocher duly provided a table of some estimated dates of origin, reproduced below from page 147 (notably, Vyasa is incorrectly attributed to have composed the scripture between 900-800 B.C., not at the onset of Kali Yuga as stated in the scripture, calculated to have occurred around 3100 B.C.):

References 

Krishna
Puranas
Hindu texts
Vaishnava texts
Gaudiya Vaishnavism
Indology